Western Karenni was the collective name for the four Karenni States located west of the Salween River: Bawlake, Nammekon, Naungpale, and Kyebogyi. On 21 June 1875, the government of British India and king Mindon of Burma signed a treaty recognizing the independence of Western Karenni. On 23 January 1892, Western Karenni was incorporated into British India as a protectorate.

History
In 1864 a Karenni prince requested the status of British protectorate for his state, but the British authorities did not show any interest. After the death of this prince in 1869 his two sons renewed the petition claiming that they feared Burmese ambitions on their state. 
The British refused again, but agreed to arbitrate before the King of Burma. Since the Burmese monarchy insisted in their demands on the Karenni territories, the British granted recognition to four states, Kyebogyi, Namekan (Nammekon), Naungpale and Bawlake, which became independent under British protection on 21 June 1875.

States

Kyebogyi
The rulers bore the title of Myoza.

Myozas
1845 - 1890                ....
1890 - 27 Jan 1908         Hkun U                             (b. 18.. - d. 1908)
12 Jun 1908 - 1933         Hkun Sao                           (b. 1857 - d. 1933)
1933 - 1948                Vacant

Bawlake
The rulers bore the title of Myoza after 1892.

Rulers
1810? - 1850?              Po Bya Hla 
1850? - 1872               La Kye 
1872 - 23 Jan 1892         Paban                              (b. 1857 - d. 1916)

Myozas
23 Jan 1892 - 1916         Paban                              (s.a.) 
1916 - 1948                Hkun Nge                           (b. 1894 - d. 19..)

Naungpale
The rulers bore the title of Myoza after 1892.

Rulers
1845 - 23 Jan 1892         ....

Myozas
23 Jan 1892 - 1897         ....
 8 Jul 1897 - 1916         Hkun Che                           (b. 1857 - d. 1916)
1916 - 19..                ....

Nammekon
The rulers bore the title of Myoza.

Myozas
c.1860 - 1892              Po Bya
1892 - 1899                Vacant?
1899 - 1902                Hkun Baw                           (b. 1870 - d. af.1902)
1903 - 19..                Pra To                             (b. 1863 - d. 19..)

See also
Kantarawadi, also known as "Eastern Karenni".

References

Karen people
19th century in Burma
Konbaung dynasty
Kayah State